Arthur Henry Stanton (1839–1913) was an English Anglo-Catholic priest in the latter decades of the 19th and early 20th centuries.

Life
Born on 21 June 1839, he was educated at Rugby and Trinity College, Oxford, and ordained after a period of study at Ripon College Cuddesdon in 1862. His only post was as Curate at St Alban's, Holborn, 1862–1913. Stanton was an indefatigable champion of the poor, staunch champion of ritual, and exuberant preacher. He attracted devoted supporters and horrified critics in equal measure.  In 1877 he founded a society for postmen, the Saint Martin's League. At the end of his life he was offered, and rejected, a prebendal stall in St Paul's Cathedral.

Death 
Following his death on 28 March 1913, his funeral took place on 1 April 1913. Fellow clergy escorted his coffin as it was carried on a wheeled bier through crowded streets from his Holborn church to the London Necropolis railway station, Waterloo for transport to Brookwood Cemetery near Woking where a crowd of 1,000 had assembled for his interment.

References

Further reading
G. W. E. Russell Saint Alban the Martyr, Holborn. London: George Allen

External links
 

1839 births
1913 deaths
19th-century English Anglican priests
Alumni of Trinity College, Oxford
Anglo-Catholic clergy
Anglo-Catholic socialists
Burials at Brookwood Cemetery
English Anglo-Catholics
English Christian socialists
People educated at Rugby School
People from Gloucestershire
People from Holborn